The Human Rights and Citizenship Party is an Egyptian political party.

The party ran in the 2011-2012 Egyptian parliamentary election in Alexandria and Assiut.

References

2011 establishments in Egypt
Centrist parties in Egypt
Political parties established in 2011
Political parties in Egypt